The Men's scratch competition at the 2021 UCI Track Cycling World Championships was held on 21 October 2021.

Results
The race was started at 19:48. First rider across the line without a net lap loss won.

References

Men's scratch